Wivelrod is a hamlet in the large civil parish of Bentworth in Hampshire, England.

Until 1932 it was the Bentworth and Lasham railway station on the Basingstoke and Alton Light Railway.

The area was inhabited in ancient times and some Tumuli and Burial Mounds are on Wivelrod Hill. Also, at Wivelrod House, finds include Pottery, bone objects, spindle-whorls (stone discs with a hole in the middle used in spinning thread) and fragments of Roman roofing tiles.

Geography and demographics
The landscape surrounding the hamlet mostly consists of high downland with woods and plantations. Notable woods in the vicinity include Colliers Wood, Childer Hill Copse, and North.

According to the 2011 census Bentworth had a population of 553 people, of which 33.30% of them were in full-time employment, somewhat lower than the national average of 37.70%. In addition, the parish contains 221 households  with an average size of 2.62 people. Wivelrod is not listed individually in the census.

Climate
Due to its location in south central England and its proximity to the sea, the average maximum temperature in January is 7.2 °C (45 °F) with the average minimum being 1.6 °C (35 °F). The average maximum temperature in July is 21.9 °C (71 °F), with the average minimum being 12.5 °C (55 °F). The village gets around 755 millimetres (29.7 in) of rain a year, with a minimum of 1 mm (0.04 in) of rain reported on 103 days a year.

References

Hamlets in Hampshire